John M. Alberts is a former member of the Wisconsin State Assembly.

Biography
Alberts was born on April 24, 1933 in Oconomowoc, Wisconsin. He graduated from Oconomowoc High School and Carroll University. Alberts in married with four children and has been a member of Kiwanis.

Career
Alberts was first a member of the Assembly from 1969 to 1973. In 1981, he was re-elected to the Assembly in a special election to fill the vacancy caused by the resignation of Harry G. Snyder. Alberts was also a candidate for Lieutenant Governor of Wisconsin in 1974, running on the gubernatorial ticket with William Dyke. They would lose to incumbents Patrick Lucey and Martin J. Schreiber. Alberts was a Republican.

References

People from Oconomowoc, Wisconsin
Republican Party members of the Wisconsin State Assembly
Carroll University alumni
1933 births
Living people